Jaroslav Sakala (born 14 July 1969) is a former ski jumper who competed for Czechoslovakia and the Czech Republic.

Career
He entered his first World Cup competition on 15 January 1989 in Harrachov. His first big success was at the 1992 Winter Olympics in Albertville with a bronze medal in the team large hill. Sakala finished second in the 1992-93 Overall World Cup ski jumping and fourth the following season.

He won three medals at the FIS Nordic World Ski Championships 1993 in Falun with a silver in the individual normal hill and bronzes in the individual and team large hills. Sakala achieved his first World Cup victory on 30 January 1993 at Planica. His only victory on a regular ski jump was in Liberec on 16 January 1994. Sakala's fourth and final World Cup victory on 20 March 1994 at Planica when he won the Ski Flying World Championships. He was the first Czech to break the 200 metre barrier. He could not follow up on these successes in the years afterward and he did not win a medal in ski jumping after 1996,  Sakala made more frequent ski flying appearances from 1996 until his 2002 retirement.

World Cup

Standings

Wins

References
 
 More about Sakala Name

1969 births
Czech male ski jumpers
Czechoslovak male ski jumpers
Living people
Olympic bronze medalists for Czechoslovakia
Olympic ski jumpers of Czechoslovakia
Olympic ski jumpers of the Czech Republic
People from Krnov
Ski jumpers at the 1992 Winter Olympics
Ski jumpers at the 1994 Winter Olympics
Ski jumpers at the 1998 Winter Olympics
Olympic medalists in ski jumping
FIS Nordic World Ski Championships medalists in ski jumping
Medalists at the 1992 Winter Olympics
Sportspeople from the Moravian-Silesian Region